Glennville is a city in Tattnall County, Georgia, United States. As of the 2020 census, the city had a population of 3,834.

Geography
Glennville is located at  (31.939206, -81.926866). It is 29.3 miles from Baxley, Georgia.

Demographics

2020 census

As of the 2020 United States census, there were 3,834 people, 1,477 households, and 1,071 families residing in the city.

2000 census
As of the census of 2000, there were 3,641 people, 1,428 households, and 912 families residing in the city. The racial makeup of the city was 63.36% White, 33.64% African American, 0.14% Native American, 0.71% Asian, 0.11% Pacific Islander, 1.29% from other races, and 0.74% from two or more races. Hispanic or Latino of any race were 2.42% of the population.

There were 1,428 households, out of which 29.8% had children under the age of 18 living with them, 44.2% were married couples living together, 16.1% had a female householder with no husband present, and 36.1% were non-families. 32.2% of all households were made up of individuals, and 16.5% had someone living alone who was 65 years of age or older.  The average household size was 2.42 and the average family size was 3.07.

In the city, the population was spread out, with 26.5% under the age of 18, 8.3% from 18 to 24, 24.6% from 25 to 44, 20.8% from 45 to 64, and 19.8% who were 65 years of age or older.  The median age was 38 years. For every 100 females, there were 78.6 males.  For every 100 females age 18 and over, there were 72.0 males.

The median income for a household in the city was $24,309, and the median income for a family was $35,066. Males had a median income of $26,861 versus $16,982 for females. The per capita income for the city was $13,427.  About 21.7% of families and 28.7% of the population were below the poverty line, including 46.0% of those under age 18 and 17.2% of those age 65 or over.

The Georgia Department of Corrections provides jobs for hundreds of people within the local area of the city of Glennville and the rest of Tattnall County and surrounding counties. Smith State Prison, which is a close security facility, is located right in the heart of Glennville.  The facility can house 1000+/ inmates at any given time.

The city is known for farming crickets and pecans.

Notable people
Shannon Sharpe, co-host of FS1 Undisputed, former football analyst for CBS, former collegiate and professional football player with Savannah State University and the Denver Broncos, Pro Football Hall of Fame Inductee 2011, brother of Sterling Sharpe
Sterling Sharpe, former collegiate and professional football player with the University of South Carolina and the Green Bay Packers. 2014 College Football Hall of Fame Inductee, brother of Shannon Sharpe
Katelyn Tarver, singer, actress, and model
Drew Tarver, actor and comedian
 Osjha Anderson, Miss Georgia 1999
Cole Swindell, American country music singer-songwriter
Mason G. Rhodes, Former collegiate athlete of Paine College (Historically Black College and University), Rio Olympian/Paralympian 2016 
Jesse Finch, 1956 USA Olympic Games Melbourne Australia
 Beach Dickerson Hollywood actor & producer who worked frequently with director Roger Corman.  Born in Glenville in 1924 - Died in Los Angeles at 81 in 2005.
Laura Belle Barnard, missionary, humanitarian, and educator. Author of The Biblical Basis of Missions.

Media

Newspaper
The Journal Sentinel
Glenville is the principal  site of Calder Willingham's novel "Eternal Fire."

See also
Beards Creek Primitive Baptist Church

References

External links
 Glenville website

Cities in Georgia (U.S. state)
Cities in Tattnall County, Georgia